Robert Stuart O’Loughlin (1852–1925) was Dean of Dromore from 1905   to his death and also wrote widely on religious matters.

Notes

1852 births
1925 deaths
Alumni of Trinity College Dublin
Deans of Dromore